The 1954 All-Eastern football team consists of American football players chosen by various selectors as the best players at each position among the Eastern colleges and universities during the 1954 college football season.

Quarterbacks 
 George Welsh, Navy (UP-1)
 Pete Vann, Army (AP-1 [b], INS-1)

Halfbacks 
 Tommy Bell, Army (UP-1, INS-1)
 Lenny Moore, Penn State (AP-1 [b], UP-1, INS-1)
 Royce Flippin, Princeton (AP-1 [b])

Fullbacks 
 Sam Pino, Boston University (AP-1 [b], UP-1)
 Pat Uebel, Army (INS-1)

Ends 
 Ron Beagle, Navy (AP-1, UP-1, INS-1)
 Don Holleder, Army (AP-1, UP-1, INS-1)

Tackles 
 Frank Morze, Boston College (AP-1, UP-1)
 Otto Kneidinger, Penn State (AP-1)
 Rosey Grier, Penn State (UP-1)
 Phil Tarasovic, Yale (INS-1)
 Eldred Kraemer, Pitt (INS-1)

Guards 
 Ralph Chesnauskas, Army (AP-1, UP-1)
 Bill Meigs, Harvard (AP-1, UP-1)
 Leonard Benzi, Navy (INS-1)
 John Henn, Princeton (INS-1)

Center 
 Charles Beemus, Colgate (AP-1)
 Bill Chance, Army (UP-1)
 Frank Reich, Penn State (INS-1)

Key
 AP = Associated Press
 UP = United Press
 INS = International News Service

See also
 1954 College Football All-America Team

References

All-Eastern
All-Eastern college football teams